Aakasham is a 2007 Malayalam-language film directed by Sundar Das and starring Harishree Ashokan.

Summary
Manoharan is hardworking mechanic leading a happy life with his wife, kids, mother and brother in law. His greatest dream is to own a house for himself. But his life turns for the worst when the sketch of a person accused in a bomb blast shows a strange resemblance to him. Though everyone is sure that Manoharan is innocent, he himself develops a wild fear, and he absconds from his home.

Cast

 Harisree Ashokan as Manoharan
 Innocent as Varghese Abraham Pathirikkodan
 KPAC Lalitha as Lakshmiyamma
 Baby Nayanthara as Mayakutti
 Jaffer Idukki as Sainuddin
 Jyothirmayi as Bhanu
 Mamukkoya as Mammalikka
 Nias Bekker as Jeevan
Sai Kumar as DYSP Raghunananan
Anil Murali as Ramadas
Subair as IG
TP Madhavan as Subramaniyam Potti
Ambika Mohan as Kanakam
Baiju VK as Baiju
Dinesh Nair as Autorickshaw driver
Nisha Sarang as Raghunanandan's wife
Kozhikode Narayanan Nair as Bhanu's father
Bindu Panikkar as Bharathi
KTS Padannayil as Barber
Vijayan Peringodu as Koyakka
Majeed as Police officer

References

External links

2007 films
2000s Malayalam-language films
Films directed by Sundar Das